Helly Shah (born 7 January 1996) is an Indian actress and model who primarily works in Hindi television. She made her acting debut in 2010 with Zindagi Ka Har Rang...Gulaal portraying Talli. She is best known for her portrayal of Swara Sanskaar Maheshwari in Swaragini and Devanshi Pawan Bakshi in Devanshi.

Shah earned wider recognition with her dual portrayal of Saltanat Zaroon, Kaynaat Shah in Sufiyana Pyaar Mera and her portrayal of Riddhima Vansh Raisinghania in Ishq Mein Marjawan 2 and its web series Ishq Mein Marjawan 2: Naya Safar.

Early life
Shah was born on 7 January 1996. She is a Gujarati from Ahmedabad and a vegetarian.

Career

Debut and early career (2010-2014)
Shah began her acting career when she was in 8th grade. Her career began with Star Plus's show Gulaal. In 2011 she appeared in Diya Aur Baati Hum playing Shruti. She then played Alaxmi in Life OK's Alaxmi - Hamari Super Bahu. Later, she played Ami in Khelti Hai Zindagi Aankh Micholi. She then appeared in Sony Pal's Khushiyon Kii Gullak Aashi.

Breakthrough and success (2015-2019)

From March 2015 to December 2016, Shah portrayed Swara Maheshwari in Swaragini.

In 2016, Shah participated in Colors TV's Jhalak Dikhhla Jaa (season 9). In 2017, she portrayed Devanshi Upadhyay/Bakshi in Devanshi.

In 2019, she portrayed the double role of Saltanat Shah and Kaynaat Shah in Star Bharat's Sufiyana Pyaar Mera. Next, she appeared as Neha in Star Plus's Yeh Rishtey Hain Pyaar Ke.

Further success and recent work (2020-present)

Shah portrayed Riddhima Vansh Raisinghania in Ishq Mein Marjawan 2 opposite Rrahul Sudhir and Vishal Vashishtha, that aired from 13 July 2020 to 13 March 2021 on Colors TV. After the show went off air, the new season titled Ishq Mein Marjawan 2: Naya Safar started to stream in Voot Select since 15 March, with Shah reprising the character of Riddhima.

She made her Cannes red carpet debut on 18 May 2022. She unveiled the poster of her debut film Kaya Palat, at the Cannes Film Festival on 21 May. The actress also walked  the red carpet for L’Oréal Paris at Cannes Film Festival, the first Indian television actress to walk for the event sponsors L'Orèal Paris.

In the media
Shah ranked 47th in Eastern Eye's Top 50 Asian celebrities of 2020. In 2021, she was ranked in Eastern Eye's Top 30 under 30 Global Asian Stars list.

Filmography

Films

Television

Special appearances

Web series

Music videos

Awards and nominations

References

External links
 
 

1996 births
Living people
Actresses from Ahmedabad
Female models from Gujarat
Gujarati people
Indian television actresses
Indian web series actresses
Indian film actresses
Actresses in Hindi television
Actresses in Hindi cinema
21st-century Indian actresses